Huffmans Creek is a stream in Hickory County in the U.S. state of Missouri. It is a tributary of the Little Niangua River.

Huffmans Creek bears the name of a pioneer citizen.

See also
List of rivers of Missouri

References

Rivers of Hickory County, Missouri
Rivers of Missouri